Dr. David O. Dykes (born January 16, 1953) is Pastor Emeritus and the former Senior Pastor of Green Acres Baptist Church in Tyler, Texas. He is also the author of several Christian books. Under his leadership Green Acres became "one of the leading churches in America," according to president of the SBC Executive Committee Morris Chapman.

He has opened the Texas Legislature with prayer and opened the US House with prayer in 2008.  He is the pastor of U.S. Representative Louie Gohmert and Texas State Representative Matt Schaefer.

Dykes was honored by the Southern Baptist Convention Executive Committee with its highest honor, the M.E. Dodd Award, for a lifetime of work.

Early life and education
Dr. Dykes was reared in South Alabama, where he began preaching at age 17. He received a B.A. from Samford University in Birmingham, Alabama in 1975.  Rev. Dykes received his Master of Divinity degree from the Southern Baptist Theological Seminary in Louisville, Kentucky.  He also earned his Doctor of Ministry degree with emphasis on evangelism and church growth from the Southern Baptist Theological Seminary.  He received post-doctoral training at Cambridge University in Cambridge, England.

Ministry
Dykes has been preaching since 1970. He pastored churches in Alabama before coming to Green Acres Baptist Church in 1991. Green Acres has roughly 14,000 members. Roughly 6,000 people worship there each Sunday, and about 8,000 people worship there on major Christian holidays. Since he took over as pastor, 2,000 people were baptized at the church.

Green Acres was designated a Global Priority Church by the International Missions Board because of Dr. Dykes's emphasis on missions. The North American Mission Board also designated Green Acres as a Key Church due to Dykes's work partnering with other churches for missions at home and overseas. In the last fourteen years, Green Acres has sent over 1,000 volunteer missionaries to various locations worldwide and has been the church among Southern Baptists with the most given to the Cooperative Program for the last 14 years. He has personally led mission teams to 10 countries, including trips to Ukraine, Mexico, Belize, Brazil, and Argentina. He trains church leaders in the US and around the world each year on biblical principles of leadership. Dykes has led over twenty educational tours to the Holy Land Israel.

He is an enthusiastic supporter of the Cooperative Program. Green Acres is regularly the top contributor to the Cooperative Program. In 2007, they raised $1,445,909, almost a half-million dollars more than the second-place total. The cooperative program has received $10 million since 2000, more than half of the total $18.4 million raised for missions.

In 2009, he hosted the Hope For 100 "If You Were Mine" conference with the goal of encouraging people to adopt and foster care. He is also a supporter of Acquire the Fire's Relentless Pursuit.

In February 2021 Dykes announced his pending retirement from the pulpit, to take place at the end of August, in order to allow a smooth transition to whoever will be the new pastor, something which he mentioned didn't happen when he became pastor. Dr. Michael Gossett became Senior Pastor August 29, 2021.

Politics
Dr. Dykes participated in Pulpit Freedom Sunday, voicing support for Mitt Romney. 
Dr. Dykes and Congressman Gohmert invited Joel Rosenberg to discuss his book, Damascus Count Down, about the endtimes and the possibility of a foreign-policy mistake by a president leading to war. He takes public political positions that upset some people because of his ties to elected officials in his church, mostly Congressman Louie Gohmert. 

He endorsed Tom Leppert for Senate.

Writings
Dr. Dykes has published articles in Moody Monthly, Church Administration and Guideposts.  He is the author of eleven books.

Books
Handling Life's Disappointments (1993)
Do Angels Really Exist?: Separating Fact from Fantasy (1996)
Ten Requirements for American's Survival (2004)
Character Out of Chaos: Daring to Be a Daniel in Today's World (2005)
Angels Really Do Exist (2005)  
Finding Peace in Your Pain (2008)
No, That's Not in the Bible (2009)
Revelation: God's Final Word (2010)
Jesus Storyteller: Timeless Truths from His Parables (2011)
Hope When You Need It Most (2012)

References

1953 births
Living people
People from Tyler, Texas
Samford University alumni
Southern Baptist ministers
Southern Baptist Theological Seminary alumni